Cássia Rejane Eller (Portuguese: /ˈkasjɐ ʁeˈʒɐni ˈɛleʁ/) (December 10, 1962 – December 29, 2001) was a Brazilian singer and musician. She came to prominence in the early 1990s and performed a mix of rock and MPB. Eller released five studio albums in her lifetime: Cássia Eller (1990), O Marginal (1992), Cássia Eller (1994), Veneno AntiMonotonia (1997) and Com Você... Meu Mundo Ficaria Completo (1999). Her sixth studio album, Dez de Dezembro (2002) was released posthumously. Eller's most successful album was Acústico MTV – Cássia Eller (2001), selling over 1 million copies. She was ranked as the 18th greatest vocalist and 40th greatest Brazilian musician by Rolling Stone Brasil. On December 29, 2001, Eller died of a heart attack caused by a malformation of her heart at the age of 39.

Biography

Early life and career
Daughter of an Army paratrooper sergeant and a housewife, her name was suggested by her grandmother, who was devoted to St. Rita of Cascia.

Born in Rio de Janeiro, RJ, she moved with her family to Belo Horizonte, Minas Gerais at six years old. When she was 10 years old, she went to Santarém, Pará, and at age 12 returned to Rio. Her interest in music began when she received a guitar as a gift at age 14. She played mostly Beatles songs. At the age of 18, she arrived in Brasília, where her family moved. There she sang in choir, auditioned for musicals, worked in two operas as a showgirl, and performed as a singer for a forró group. She was also part of the first electric trio of Brasília, called Massa Real, and played the Surdo drum in a samba group. She played and sang in several bars (including Bom Demais). In 1981, she appeared in a spectacle of Oswaldo Montenegro.

A year later, at age 19, wanting her personal freedom, she moved to Belo Horizonte for a place to live and a job.  As soon as she arrived, she went to work as a bricklayer. "I made mortar and set up bricks," she said. There she lived in a small rented room. She did not finish high school because the shows she was doing every day on a different shift did not allow her a schedule to study.

Characterized by deep voice and her eclectic choices of material, she played songs of great composers of Brazilian rock such as Cazuza, Renato Russo and Rita Lee, as well as of MPB like Caetano Veloso and Chico Buarque, and of pop like Nando Reis, and of sambas like Riachão and of international rock like Janis Joplin, Jimi Hendrix, The Beatles, John Lennon and Nirvana.

She had a significant musical career, even though short, with ten recorded albums over the course of the twelve years. In fact, it was only in 1989 that her career took off. Helped by her uncle, she recorded a demo tape with the song "Por Enquanto" by Renato Russo. This uncle took the tape to PolyGram, which resulted in Eller being hired by the label. Her first participation in a record was in 1990, in Wagner Tiso's album titled "Baobab".

Eller always had a very intense stage presence and preferred albums recorded live. She was constantly invited for special participations and personalized interpretations.

She declared herself to be an interpreter of other people's work, having composed only three of the songs she recorded: "Lullaby" (with Márcio Faraco) on her first album, Cássia Eller, in 1990; "Eles" and "O Marginal" (with Hermelino Neder, Luiz Pinheiro and Zé Marcos) on the second album, O Marginal (1992).

2001 was a very productive year for Eller. On January 13, 2001, she performed at Rock in Rio III in a show where baião, samba and MPB classics were sung in a rock rhythm. On this day the sequence of acts was as follows: REM, Foo Fighters, Beck, Barão Vermelho, Fernanda Abreu and Eller. 190 thousand people attended the concert.

Between May and December, Eller did 95 shows. This included recording a DVD (live, as she preferred), MTV Unplugged, between March 7 and 8 in São Paulo. The project included artists of high artistic and technical ability: Nando Reis (musical direction / authorship, voice and guitar in "Relicário" / voice in "De Esquina" de Xis), the musicians of the band: Luiz Brasil (Musical Direction / Cifras / Guitars and Mandolin), Walter Villaça (Guitars and Mandolin), Fernando Nunes (bass), Paulo Calasans (Acoustic Piano and Organ Hammond), João Vianna (Drums, Surdo, Ganzá, Grater and Blade), Lan Lan (Percussion and Vocal) and Tamima Brasil (Percussion), guest musicians Bernardo Bessler (violin), Iura (Cello), Alberto Continentino (bass sound), Cristiano Alves (clarinet and bass clarinet), Dirceu Leite (sax, flute and clarinet), among many others. The album was composed of 17 tracks, plus the Making Of, photo gallery, discography and i.clip. The album has sold more than a million copies to date and became the biggest hit in Eller's career. Up to then she was not considered an extremely popular singer despite good sales and experience.

In the same year of 2001, she would perform at MTV's Video Music Brasil in her MTV Unplugged alongside Rita Lee, Roberto de Carvalho and Nando Reis (performing Os Mutantes' "Top Top").

At the end of the year, she was scheduled to perform at Praça do Ó, in Barra da Tijuca, Rio de Janeiro, during the celebrations of the new year. She died two days before, on December 29. Luciana Mello was her replacement. At several spots in Rio de Janeiro, there was a minute of silence during the homage of the passage of the year in memory of Eller. Several artists also paid homage to the singer at their shows at the turn of the year.

Eller's sixth studio album, Dez de Dezembro was released posthumously on her 40th birthday, on December 10, 2002.

Personal life
In 1993, Eller gave birth to her first and only child, a son named Francisco (affectionately called Chicão), the love child of a casual relationship with a friend, bassist Tavinho Fialho. Tavinho was married and died in a car accident a week before Chicão was born. Chicão was raised by Eller and her partner Maria Eugênia Vieira Martins. The two had been in a relationship since 1987 and stayed together until Eller's death in 2001. Eller's request was that if something happened to her, Maria Eugênia would be responsible for the care of Francisco, and after her death her partner did raise the boy after a legal battle over his custody against Eller's father.

Eller was a passionate fan of Clube Atlético Mineiro, and was even contacted to receive the Silver Rooster, an honor given to the illustrious fans of the Club. However, with her untimely death, the trophy ended up being delivered in 2002 to her mother, Nanci Eller, according to whom: "Last year Cássia performed in Curitiba, and Levir Culpi sent a Rooster shirt for her, her son. All of her instruments have the Athletic shield. She always put the shield on the things she won. There is even a shield on the door of the studio that Eller had in her residence".

Eller was openly bisexual.

Death 

Cássia Eller died on December 29, 2001, in the Santa Maria clinic in the Laranjeiras neighborhood, in the south of Rio de Janeiro, after suffering three cardiac arrests due to sudden Myocardial infarction. She was 39 years old and at the peak of her career. She had been hospitalized at 1 pm and was placed in the ICU (Intensive Care Center). According to her manager, the singer was feeling bad and complaining of nausea due to overwork. The symptoms, he said, were thought to be the result of stress caused by overwork. "She had been working a lot. In seven months, she's done over a hundred shows," she said. The hypothesis of drug overdose was raised. This was initially considered as the cause of death, but was dismissed by the coroner report of the Medical Institute of Rio de Janeiro after necropsy. The coroner report stated that Eller died of a heart attack, caused by a malformation of her heart. The toxicology report found no alcohol or drug residues in her body. Histopathological exams revealed Eller had heart problems, such as mild coronary sclerosis (early onset of fat thrombi) and myocardial fibrosis (scars from other pre-existing lesions).

She is buried at the Jardim da Saudade Cemetery, in the Sulacap neighborhood, in the city of Rio de Janeiro.

Discography 
Studio albums
 Cássia Eller (1990)
 O Marginal (1992)
 Cássia Eller (1994)
 Veneno AntiMonotonia (1997)
 Com Você... Meu Mundo Ficaria Completo (1999)
 Dez de Dezembro (2002)
 Cássia Eller & Victor Biglione in blues (2022) 

Live albums
 Cássia Eller ao Vivo (1996)
 Veneno Vivo (1998)
 Cássia Rock Eller (2000)
 Acústico MTV – Cássia Eller (2001)
 Rock in Rio: Cássia Eller Ao Vivo (2006)

References

External links

1962 births
2001 deaths
20th-century guitarists
21st-century guitarists
20th-century Brazilian women singers
21st-century Brazilian women singers
Brazilian women guitarists
Brazilian women rock singers
Brazilian rock singers
Brazilian rock guitarists
American rock musicians
Brazilian rock musicians
Brazilian people of German descent
Brazilian atheists
Women rock singers
Música Popular Brasileira singers
Música Popular Brasileira guitarists
Samba musicians
Lesbian singers
Brazilian lesbian musicians
Brazilian LGBT singers
Latin Grammy Award winners
Musicians from Rio de Janeiro (city)
20th-century Brazilian LGBT people
21st-century Brazilian LGBT people
Women in Latin music
LGBT people in Latin music
20th-century women guitarists
21st-century women guitarists
Bisexual women
Bisexual singers